Patrick Joseph McDonnell (29 April 1895 – 18 July 1977) was an  Gaelic footballer and Gaelic games administrator. At club level, he played with O'Tooles and also lined out at inter-county level with Dublin.

Career

McDonnell first played competitive football during a golden age for the O'Tooles club. In ten years from 1918 until 1928 he won nine county senior championship medals with the club before adding a tenth in 1931.

Success at club level saw McDonnell join the Dublin senior team and he made his debut during the 1919 championship. Over the course of the next decade he had much success and won three successive All-Ireland medals between 1921 and 1923, albeit his first medal was as a non-playing substitute. He also won six Leinster medals.

His brother, Johnny McDonnell, was also an All-Ireland medal winner with Dublin.

Honours
O'Tooles
Dublin Senior Football Championship: 1918, 1919, 1920, 1922, 1923, 1924, 1925, 1926, 1928, 1931

Dublin
All-Ireland Senior Football Championship: 1921, 1922, 1923
Leinster Senior Football Championship: 1920, 1921, 1922, 1923, 1924, 1932
All-Ireland Junior Football Championship: 1916
Leinster Junior Football Championship: 1916

Leinster
Railway Cup: 1928, 1929, 1930

References

1895 births
1977 deaths
O'Tooles Gaelic footballers
Dublin inter-county Gaelic footballers
Leinster inter-provincial Gaelic footballers